Fragilariophyceae is a group of pennate diatoms lacking a raphe.

Examples
It includes the following genera:

Fragilariales
Ardissonea
Asterionella
Asterionellopsis
Catacombas
Diatoma
Fragilaria
Fragilariforma
Grammonema
Hyalosynedra
Neofragilaria
Opephora
Pseudostaurosira
Punctastriata
Staurosira
Staurosirella
Synedra
Synedropsis
Tabularia
Ulnaria

Striatellales
Hyalosira
Striatella
Toxarium

Other
Climacosphenia
Cyclophora
Delphineis
Protoraphis
Rhabdonema
Rhaphoneis
Tabellaria
Thalassionema

References

Heterokont classes